"Endless Story" is the first single by Yuna Ito, released under the name Reira starring Yuna Ito. "Endless Story" was used in the movie Nana in which Yuna played the character Reira Serizawa. "Endless Story" peaked at #2 on both the daily and weekly charts its first week, and reached  #1 on the daily charts on multiple occasions, but was unable to reach #1 on the weekly charts. At the end of 2005, "Endless Story" was named the "Best Love Song of 2005" by the Oricon magazine. It holds the record for the most downloaded debut song for a female artist. On 24 January 2007, according to an Oricon blog, "'Endless Story' was still charting, and at no.144 for that week, and now 471,099 copies are sold". This song has a sample from Faith Hill's "If I'm Not In Love", which is clear on both songs verses, and similarities to "Endless Story"'s English parts.

Track listing
"Endless Story"
"Journey"
"Endless Story" (instrumental)
"Journey" (instrumental)

Charts
Oricon Sales Chart (Japan)

Cover versions
The Japanese singer Hideaki Tokunaga covered the song on his 2007 album Vocalist 3.

Saya Chang, a Taiwanese singer, covered "Endless Story" and renamed it "Xiang Nian Ni De Ge".

The Hong Kong singer, Janice Vidal also covered this song as "Cloudy Holidays" in her 2008 Cantonese album, Serving You.

1993 songs
2005 singles
Yuna Ito songs
Japanese film songs